= Eclipse Sol-Air =

French musical band

- Genres: Rock, Bluesrock, Progressive, Psychedelic
- Years active: 2004–present
- Members: Philippe Matic-Arnauld des Lions; Mireille Vicogne; Fritz Hoffmeister; Agatha Sörgel; Melina Mayer-Gallo; Benno Schultheiss; David Bücherl
- Past members: Katharina Strobel; Andreas Hagen; Philipp Grahl; Maja Stevanović; Eva Fickert; Stefan Seyfried; Oliver Horeth; Moritz Oeding
- Website: www.eclipse-sol-air.de

Eclipse Sol-Air is a French band composed of seven musicians, which was founded in 2004 by Philippe Matic-Arnauld des Lions from France. The musical style of their own songs can be described as a mixture of styles, their individual sound and performance being provided by the violin, flute and piano in combination with French, English, German and Croatian lyrics.

== Band history ==
Eclipse Sol-Air (ESA for short) came into being in 2004. As a quintet the musicians brought out their first album in 2006 - The Dark Side Guide. The first breakthrough for Philippe came after a number of changes to the line-up of the band, with the arrival of French singer and flautist Mireille Vicogne and the violinist Kathi Strobel, with whom he won first place in several competitions in 2009 and 2010. A highlight was being engaged by the European Space Agency, which has the same abbreviation as the band, namely “ESA”, to record a promotional video with the instrumental music from their “Reactor Song”.

In early 2010 the band was discovered by industry executive Dr. Hans Helmut Itzel, who helped the band draw up a strategy for the future and took on the role of patron. Part of the strategy was to replace the previous drummer Andreas Hagen with percussion teacher David Bücherl, who teaches at a well-known percussion school in Europe, Drummers Focus in Munich, from which he had also qualified himself. Guitar player Fritz Hoffmeister, who qualified from the Muenchener Gitarreninstitut, and e-bass and double-bass player Benno Schultheiss, completed the line-up.

Highlights were the concert at the Audi Max at Regensburg University together with the Regensburg University Symphony Orchestra, for which Philippe, at the time a music student at the university, and music director Graham Buckland wrote the orchestral score for the band's songs; plus an appearance at a festival in Clermont-Ferrand 2010.

It was with this line-up that their first well-known debut album “Bartoks Crisis” was recorded.

Early in 2011 violinist Kathi left the band to dedicate herself to her violin studies, and violinist Agatha Sörgel (“Kitty Power”) joined the ensemble. Following the decision not to allow the acting talents of Philippe to go to waste behind the keyboard any longer but to make him frontman alongside frontwoman Mireille as the “front duo”, pianist Melina Mayer joined the band to take over the keyboard and piano role previously played by Philippe.

Over the course of 2011 there were concerts and cameo appearances – among them the Festival hr3@night, the hr3 Premium Rock Tour, at the Hirsch Nuremberg and other locations around Germany. At some of the performances singer and entertainer Helen Pfaff stood in for Mireille while she was pregnant.

In December 2011 the band took part in the German Rock Pop Awards in Wiesbaden and were honoured with four awards: Mireille the first place for best German female rock singer for her German-English ballad “Benedictus”; second place in the category of best German instrumental group for the instrumental version of their Reactor Song; third place in the category of best German rock album with “Bartoks Crisis”; and third place for the best German progressive group.

== Music ==
Eclipse Sol-Air play a musical mixture featuring elements from Genesis, Marillion, Pink Floyd and Dream Theater, with a touch of Rammstein and Schoenberg and Bach, in styles gothic, metal, medieval, classical, and symphonic poetry.

Rock magazine “eclipsed” wrote about Eclipse Sol-Air: '"an ensemble that, with its music, unites lovers of classical and medieval music with prog fans and friends of romantic rockers like Hölderlin…"'.

Their French-English-German hit “You`ll see it tomorrow”, focusing on the problems of child soldiers in Africa, was played on radio stations in 2010/2011.

== Concerts ==
Their “Reactor-Song”, written by Philippe in reminiscence of his own moment of birth in Paris coinciding with the time of the Chernobyl nuclear accident, starts off on stage with a classical music chaos intro which is supposed to simulate the confusion of an accident at a nuclear reactor. The lead track on Bartoks Crisis, “The Romanians”, a German-English-Croatian-French rock epic, is one that they rarely play live, because the middle part contains a rock piano concerto that Philippe can only play on a Bösendorfer grand piano, and such pianos are only seldom to be seen on a rock stage.

In July 2012 Eclipse Sol-Air played at the Burg Herzberg Festival.

== Work with other artists ==
The artistic cover for the “Bartoks Crisis” album was painted by the young Berlin artist Anna Kotarska. She lost her life in 2010 at the age of 26, when she was fatally injured by a drunken car driver outside her front door. The band has written a song in her memory as an obituary entitled “Watch Over You”, and this will be included on the new album Schizophilia.

2011 saw Philippe and the manager of the band, Hanshelmut, meet up with the composer of film music Hans Zimmer in London, to discuss the music of Eclipse Sol-Air with him over the course of several days and to pick up tips about success in the music business. While there they also met violinist Aleksey Igudesmann, who gave the band interesting tips about stage presence for violinists in rock concerts.

Eclipse Sol-Air work with guest artists and musicians on the recordings of their albums, including orchestras, saxophone players and choirs.

== Discography ==
- 2006: The Dark Side Guide (CD)
- 2010: You`ll see it tomorrow (Maxi-CD)
- 2011: Bartoks Crisis (Doppel-Vinyl+CD)
- 2012: Schizophilia (CD) (planned release 7/2012)
