= Drummers Focus =

Drummer's focus is a private drum institute, founded in 1982 in Munich, Germany by Cloy Petersen. Today it is Europe’s biggest drum school in terms of students, 1200 active students, and teachers, more than 30 teachers.
Drummer's focus has become famous for its unique and modern teaching concepts.

== Locations ==
- Munich (since 1983)
- Stuttgart (since 1994)
- Markdorf at the Lake of Constance (since 2002)
- Salzburg, Austria (since 2005)
- Cologne (since 2005)
- Friedrichshafen (since 2007)

== Education ==
Drummer's focus provides education for both beginners and advanced students, both amateurs as well as professionals. They also offer an award to become a professional Teacher. The qualifications are comparable to a high-class university degree and officially accredited by the Bavarian Department of Education.

Drummer's focus runs over 1200 teaching units per week.

== Sources ==
de:Drummers Focus
